The Minister of Home Affairs is the minister in the Cabinet of South Africa with responsibility for the Department of Home Affairs. This position is currently filled by Aaron Motsoaledi, who was appointed by President Cyril Ramaphosa on 29 May 2019. The position includes responsibility for immigration, refugee and asylum policy, for the civil registry, and for the issuing of identity documents and passports.

List of Past Ministers

Minister of the Interior Affairs, 1910–1984

Minister of Internal Affairs, 1984–1994

Minister of Home Affairs, 1994–present

References 

Home Affairs
South Africa
 
Lists of political office-holders in South Africa